Henry Township is one of thirteen townships in Henry County, Indiana, United States. As of the 2010 census, its population was 22,560 and it contained 10,863 housing units.

Geography
The streams of Baker Branch, Boulder Run, Castle Run, Dark Run, Elliott Cemetery Run, Elliott Run, Grove Run, Hillcrest Brook, Little Blue River, Memorial Creek, Mound Run, Penns Run, Pink Creek, Saint Creek, Saint Johns Drain, Sky Run, Sugar Drain, Suncrest Brook, West Leg Westwood Run, Westwood Run and Wood Brook run through this township.

Cities and towns
 New Castle (the county seat)

Unincorporated towns
 Belmont
 Van Nuys
 Westwood
(This list is based on USGS data and may include former settlements.)

Adjacent townships
 Prairie Township (north)
 Liberty Township (east)
 Franklin Township (south)
 Spiceland Township (southwest)
 Greensboro Township (west)
 Harrison Township (west)
 Jefferson Township (northwest)

Cemeteries
The township contains three cemeteries: Elliott, Saint Johns and South Mound.

Major highways
  Indiana State Road 3
  Indiana State Road 38
  Indiana State Road 103

Airports and landing strips
 New Castle Municipal Airport

References
 
 United States Census Bureau cartographic boundary files

External links
 Indiana Township Association
 United Township Association of Indiana

Townships in Henry County, Indiana
Townships in Indiana